George Wilber Browning (September 18, 1870 – January 31, 1961) was an American politician who represented Goochland and Fluvanna counties in the Virginia House of Delegates.

References

External links 

1870 births
1961 deaths
Democratic Party members of the Virginia House of Delegates
19th-century American politicians